Quentin Bonnet (born 24 August 1990) is a French professional footballer who currently plays for La Roche VF as a defender.

Career statistics

External links
 Quentin Bonnet at foot-national.com
 
 
 

1990 births
Living people
People from La Roche-sur-Yon
French footballers
Association football defenders
Vannes OC players
Vendée Poiré-sur-Vie Football players
US Avranches players
Les Herbiers VF players
La Roche VF players
Championnat National players
Championnat National 2 players
Championnat National 3 players
Sportspeople from Vendée
Footballers from Pays de la Loire